Jefferson County Christian School (established in 1978) is a private Christian school located in Wintersville, Ohio. It is a non-denominational Christian school.

About
Jefferson County Christian School (JCCS) includes classes from Pre-K up to the 12th grade. JCCS has been graduating classes since 1997. At JCCS students are given ample opportunity to grow in many different aspects of Christian life, from early learning, all the way to High School with the annual spring musical to varsity athletics. Its competitive sports program has brought teams to 6 championship games (4 girls & 2 boys) in the past year.

"JCCS is committed to developing students that are mature, highly educated, life-long learners who will lead and impact their world for Christ."

JCCS is currently administered by Mrs. Lori Jarrett and various teachers and volunteers.

Athletics
Jefferson County Christian School competes in the SWCAC.
Fall Sports
Boys
Varsity Soccer
Junior High Basketball
Junior Varsity Basketball
Varsity Basketball
Girls
Junior High Volleyball
Junior Varsity Volleyball
Varsity Volleyball
Junior High Basketball
Junior Varsity Basketball
Varsity Basketball
Co-Ed
Junior High Soccer
Spring Sports
Boys
Varsity Baseball
Girls
Varsity Softball

School Events
High School Spring Musical
French Bakery
Europe Trip
Baltimore, MD Trip
Washington, DC Trip
New York City Trip
Canada Trip

High School Spring Musical
The JCCS High School has put on a spring musical for 18 years. It has been renowned for its excellence in acting, singing, and stage crew in the community every year. JCCS has performed Cinderella, Fiddler on the Roof, Beauty and the Beast, Charlie Brown, Pirates of Penzance, Annie, and many more fantastic musicals.

Student Organizations and Clubs
French Club
Community Outreach Team
Chapel Worship Team
Drama Club
Performing Arts
Yearbook Committee
High School Officers (Council)

External links
http://www.myjccs.org/

Christian schools in Ohio
Education in Jefferson County, Ohio
Private high schools in Ohio
Educational institutions established in 1978
Private middle schools in Ohio
Private elementary schools in Ohio
1978 establishments in Ohio